The Independent Luxembourg Trade Union Confederation  (Luxembourgish: Onofhängege Gewerkschaftsbond Lëtzebuerg, German: Unabhängiger Gewerkschaftsbund Luxemburg), also OGBL or OGB-L, is a Luxembourgish general union.

History
The union was established in 1979, when the Luxembourg Workers' Union merged with the General Federation of Teachers of Luxembourg.  They hoped that the country's other unions would join the merger, but only the leadership of the Luxembourg Association of Banking and Insurance Employees, the Federation of Private Employees, and the Neutral Craftsmen Union did so.  The new union affiliated to the General Confederation of Labour of Luxembourg and, given its size, it has since been the dominant force in the federation.

The union grew over time, absorbing the Association of Professional Drivers, and the Federation of Printing Workers of Luxembourg.  It is open to all workers and pensioners, and is based in Esch-Alzette. It was divided into 15 professional trade unions, according to the different employee groups.  In 2020, the National Federation of Railway Workers, Transport Workers, Civil Servants and Employees of Luxembourg agreed to join, as its sixteenth sectoral union.

The OGBL publishes the members' magazine Aktuell in multiple languages.

Presidents
1979: John Castegnaro
2004: Jean-Claude Reding
2014: André Roeltgen
2019: Nora Back

Further reading 
 Den Solidaritätsgedanken nicht zerstören. Gespräch mit Jean-Claude Reding, Präsident des OGBL. Forum für Politik, Gesellschaft und Kultur, No. 296, May 2010. (PDF)

External links 
 Unions of Luxembourg  (Governmental primer)

 OGBL website (French and German)

References 

Trade unions in Luxembourg
General unions
Trade unions established in 1979